Nughu is an island in the Solomon Islands; it is located in Guadalcanal Province. The estimated terrain elevation above sea level is some 12 metres.

References

Islands of the Solomon Islands